The Scout Association of Papua New Guinea is a Scouting organisation in Papua New Guinea. The Scout Association of Papua New Guinea had its origins in 1926 as a branch of The Boy Scouts Association of the United Kingdom. The Scout Association of Papua New Guinea claimed an unaudited membership of 6,284 in 2011.

History
In 1926, The Boy Scouts Association of the United Kingdom established a section in what is now Papua New Guinea. This section operated under The Boy Scouts Association's Australian Federal Council. In 1958, The Boy Scouts Association, Papua and New Guinea Branch became a branch of The Australian Boy Scouts Association when it was formed as a branch of The Boy Scouts Association of the United Kingdom. The Boy Scouts Association, Papua and New Guinea Branch changed its name to The Scout Association of Papua New Guinea. The National Scout Council of The Scout Association of Papua New Guinea was incorporated in 1975.  The Scout Association of Papua New Guinea joined the World Organization of the Scout Movement in 1976.

Programme and ideals
The Association's program requires all members to have a good understanding of their own local customs and traditions, as well as those of the other regions.

Junior Scouts-ages 8–12 
Scouts-ages 12–16
Senior Scouts-ages 16–25

The Scout emblem incorporates traditional arrows and a kundu drum.

See also
Girl Guides Association of Papua New Guinea

References

External links
web site

Scouting and Guiding in Papua New Guinea
Papua New Guinea, Scout Association of
1926 establishments in the United Kingdom
1975 establishments in Papua New Guinea
Organizations established in 1975